Rochak Kohli is an Indian music director for Bollywood films. He made his music debut in Shoojit Sircar's romantic comedy Vicky Donor with Pani Da Rang. The song was made in collaboration with Ayushmann Khurrana, the lead of the film. "Pani da rang" won the best song of 2012 at the Global Indian Music Academy Awards, MTV Video Music Awards and Big Star Entertainment awards. The song also won the best "Music and Lyrics Debut" at the Mirchi Music Awards.

His 2017 releases were Pal, Tanha Begum and Meer-e-Karwaan.

Kohli is former national creative head of the radio station BIG FM 92.7.

Discography

Non-film songs

Awards and nominations

References

External links

Living people
Indian male composers
Indian lyricists
Year of birth missing (living people)